Parliamentary elections were held in Hungary on 3 April 2022 to elect the National Assembly, coinciding with a referendum.

Hungary's incumbent prime minister Viktor Orbán declared victory on Sunday night, with partial results showing his Fidesz party leading the vote by a wide margin. Addressing his supporters after the partial results, Orbán said: "We won a victory so big that you can see it from the moon, and you can certainly see it from Brussels". Opposition leader Péter Márki-Zay admitted defeat shortly after Orbán's speech. Reuters described it as a "crushing victory".

The election had been predicted to be closer than in previous years, but Fidesz still held a 5-6 percentage point lead in the polls leading up to the vote. OSCE deployed a full monitoring mission for the vote. With Orbán seeking a fourth consecutive term in office, preliminary results showed his party Fidesz outperforming polls, winning its first absolute majority of the vote share since 2010 while expanding its supermajority to control 135 seats of the 199-seat Parliament, comfortably ahead of the opposition alliance United for Hungary, which was set to win 57 seats after 100% of the votes had been counted. The Mi Hazánk party won seats for the first time, obtaining 6 seats.

With 54.13% of the popular vote, Fidesz received the highest vote share by any party since the fall of communism in 1989.

Background

Amendment of the electoral law
The electoral law, under which the previous two elections were held (2014, 2018), specified the number of constituency candidates a party needed to run nationwide at 27, in at least 9 counties.

On 15 December 2020, the National Assembly, in which the governing parties held the needed 2/3 majority, voted to increase the requirements to a total of 71 constituency candidates in at least 14 counties and the capital.

Creation of joint opposition list
In 2019 local elections, Democratic Coalition, Jobbik, LMP, MSZP, Momentum Movement, Dialogue and numerous other parties or independent candidates ran in joint lists. It enabled opposition parties to win the majority in the General Assembly of Budapest and in ten of the 23 cities with county rights.

On 13 August 2020, Democratic Coalition, Jobbik, LMP, MSZP, Momentum Movement, MLP, UK and Dialogue decided to field joint candidates in all of Hungary’s 106 constituencies and launch a joint program for the elections.

On 15 November 2020, Democratic Coalition, Jobbik, LMP, MSZP, Momentum Movement and Dialogue agreed on running with a common candidate for Prime Minister, to be selected in a primary election. They expect the candidate to be selected by 23 October 2021.

On 20 December 2020, Democratic Coalition, Jobbik, LMP, MSZP, Momentum Movement and Dialogue decided on running together on a common list, solidifying their electoral alliance. The leaders of the respective parties have also signed a declaration containing the terms of their cooperation, titled "Korszakváltás Garanciái" ("Principles for Hungary's governance after 2022"). The opposition coalition was very ideologically diverse, something described by observers as a potential hindrance to presenting a united front to defeat Orbán.

Opposition primary

The Opposition primary was held in Hungary, between 12–27 September 2021 (first round) and 10–16 October 2021 (second round), to select the candidate for Prime Minister of Hungary supported by the opposition parties to form a coalition to compete in the 2022 Hungarian parliamentary election. It was the first countrywide primary election in the political history of Hungary.

On 17 October 2021, non-partisan candidate Péter Márki-Zay won in the runoff (second round) of the opposition primary, becoming the United Opposition candidate in the election for prime minister. The parties had also selected common candidates for single-member districts via the primary in the first round.

Electoral system
The 199 members of the National Assembly are to be elected by mixed-member majoritarian representation with two methods; 106 are elected in single-member constituencies by first-past-the-post voting, with the remaining 93 elected from a single nationwide constituency mostly by proportional representation, via a partially compensatory system (a hybrid of parallel voting and mixed single vote). The electoral threshold is set at 5%, although this is raised to 10% for coalitions of two parties and 15% for coalitions of three or more parties. Seats are to be allocated using the d'Hondt method. The electoral district borders show malapportionment, The Economist noting that constituency boundaries are drawn by the governing party and have been allowed to vary in population by 35%, resulting in Fidesz receiving 6% more of the vote in seats with fewer than 70,000 voters than seats with at least 80,000 voters in the 2014 elections (in 2010 there was little such difference).

Each minority is able to send a minority spokesman – without the rights of a MP – to the National Assembly, if the list does not reach this lowered quota.

Due to internal disputes, the National Self-Government of Romani did not participate in the election.

Parties and coalitions

The following parties are represented in the National Assembly, or are commonly included in public opinion polling:

Opinion polls

Results

Result by Constituency

Party list results by county and in the diaspora

Aftermath

   
Hungary's incumbent prime minister Viktor Orbán declared victory on Sunday night, with partial results showing his Fidesz party leading the vote by a wide margin. Addressing his supporters after the partial results, Orbán said: "We won a victory so big that you can see it from the moon, and you can certainly see it from Brussels". Orbán would go on to declare his victory as a rebuke against the Hungarian left, international media, George Soros, the "Brussels bureaucrats", and Volodymyr Zelenskyy. Opposition leader Péter Márki-Zay admitted defeat shortly after Orbán's speech. Reuters described it as a "crushing victory."

The election had been predicted to be closer than in previous years, but Fidesz still held a 5–6 percentage point lead in the polls leading up to the vote. OSCE deployed a full monitoring mission for the vote. With Orbán seeking a fourth consecutive term in office, preliminary results showed his party Fidesz was set to outperform polls, retain its supermajority and control 135 seats of the 199-seat Parliament, comfortably ahead of the opposition alliance United for Hungary, which was set to win 57 seats after 100% of the votes had been counted. The Mi Hazánk party won seats for the first time, obtaining 6 seats.

Analysis 
Domestically, the degree of Fidesz's victory was attributed to Fidesz's influence over the domestic media landscape, voters' desire for stability during the ongoing Russian invasion of Ukraine, strong ideological differences within the main opposition coalition, the perception of Márki-Zay as inexperienced, and urban–rural political polarization. Some analysts claimed that the majority of Jobbik voters turned out for Fidesz or Mi Hazánk instead of the united opposition. Márki-Zay shared this assessment, admitting that the united opposition may have lost up to "two thirds" of Jobbik voters. Other opposition leaders could not immediately agree on how to assess their defeat. DK leader Ferenc Gyurcsány and Jobbik leader Péter Jakab blamed Márky-Zay, while Bernadett Szél and Ákos Hadházy did not. Péter Ungár claimed that while it was a "strategic mistake" for a center-left alliance to nominate the conservative Márky-Zay, the united opposition's "elitist" rhetoric may have hurt it with rural voters even in traditionally left-leaning constituencies.

Politico predicted Orbán's victory would lead to further clashes between the Hungarian government and European Union institutions.

Analysts found that Fidesz performed strongest in areas with high birthrates and with lower educational or economic attainment, while the united opposition did best in Budapest and in a few other urban areas.

Conduct 
International observers' assessments of the electoral process were mixed. The Organization for Security and Co-operation in Europe (OSCE) monitoring mission evaluated that "the legal framework forms an adequate basis for democratic elections to be held, but a number of key aspects fall short of international standards." The OSCE added that the election day passed peacefully, with observers assessing the process as well-organized, orderly, and smooth.  The monitoring mission further reported that the elections "offered voters distinct alternatives and were well run, but, while competitive, was marred by the pervasive overlapping of government and ruling coalition’s messaging that blurred the line between state and party, as well as by media bias and opaque campaign funding." Human Rights Watch stated that the election was "marred by serious concerns about its fairness," adding that the "EU has responded insufficiently to the hollowing out of democracy and the rule of law in Hungary," while Freedom House described the election as neither free nor fair.

Anomalies over postal ballots
Since the 2014 parliamentary election, the right to vote is extended to Hungarian citizens, after a registration process, who do not have a permanent residence in Hungary (i.e. mostly the Hungarian diaspora in the neighboring countries, who have dual citizenship); however, they can only vote for the national list of Hungarian parties, so they do not have a chance to vote in individual constituencies. Unlike those Hungarians who have a Hungarian address but live abroad, the members of the Hungarian diaspora can cast their ballots by post without having to travel to an embassy or consulate. Critics say this method do not provide sufficient guarantees to prevent election fraud. Since 2014, the ruling party Fidesz–KDNP usually acquired more than 90 percent of the vote among the Hungarian diaspora.

Transtelex.ro, a Hungarian-language Romanian news portal revealed all possible frauds allowed by the legally undeveloped system. For instance, the registration process was not secure, as the data allowed a voter to register on behalf of another person and retrieve voting documents to any address. In the case of identification sheets, it was not possible to determine with absolute certainty whether it had actually been completed by the person whose name appears on it. As a result of a change in legislation in 2021, it was possible to return the vote without the posted security sealed envelope, therefore, there was no guarantee that the ballot paper had not been replaced. There were several reports that a person could also easily vote on behalf of their family members. Telex.hu reported a case that grandparents of a woman from Odorheiu Secuiesc, who resided in Budapest in the weeks of the election, filled her personal data and voted on her behalf. She said, "I have already been outraged that they have filled in the official paper and sent it for me, abusing my personal rights, but, in addition, they have voted for a party that I do not support because it represents an ideologically opposed position to me".

According to reports, the activists of the Fidesz-ally Alliance of Vojvodina Hungarians (VMSZ) delivered the ballot papers instead of the Pošta Srbije in Vojvodina, Serbia. News portal Szabad Magyar Szó reported that the party officials sent messages to the registered voters to come to the local offices of the VMSZ to cast their ballot there. In Transylvania, Romania, pro-Fidesz organizations and parties of the Hungarian minority, including the parliamentary party Democratic Alliance of Hungarians in Romania (UDMR or RMDSZ) also urged the registered voters to pass on their votes to them and not to entrust the postal service with the delivery of their ballot papers, because there is less chance that the vote will reach Hungary. In response, the Poșta Română complained against the call.

In the area between Livezeni and Târgu Mureș in Romania, a bag containing partially burnt Hungarian election postal ballot papers was found on illegal waste dump on 1 April 2022. Every ballot papers were filled out with votes for the opposition United for Hungary alliance or Our Homeland Movement. The National Election Office (NVI) and the Hungarian Civil Liberties Union (TASZ) filed a criminal complaint over the burnt ballot papers to the Hungarian Police. Péter Márki-Zay, prime minister-candidate of the United for Hungary called on the annulment of all postal votes. Anna Orosz of the Momentum Movement demanded that the government ensure a level playing field for all Hungarian citizens voting abroad. Jobbik politician Dániel Z. Kárpát compared the scandal with the infamous "blue-ballot" election in 1947. The Fidesz blamed the United for Hungary for burning the ballot papers, saying "the desperate left-wing is capable of anything despicable". The Fidesz-ally UDMR also condemned the "accusations of election fraud", assuming "an organized provocation" against the ethnic Hungarian minority in Romania. The National Election Commission (NVB) announced on 3 April it will not investigate the issue of the discarded and burned postal ballots, because the election law only covers the territory of Hungary. The Curia of Hungary upheld the NVB's decision on 10 April 2022.

The ruling Fidesz acquired 93.91 percent of the mail votes, which accounted for 8% of all votes cast on the party's national list. This meant an extra mandate for Fidesz. The United for Hungary and the Our Homeland gained only 4.1 and 1.06 percent, respectively.

International responses 
Heads of government and heads of state congratulating Orbán on his victory included Russian president Vladimir Putin, Czech president Miloš Zeman, Slovenian prime minister Janez Janša, Croatian prime minister Andrej Plenković, Kazakh president Kassym-Jomart Tokayev, Indian prime minister Narendra Modi, Albanian prime minister Edi Rama, Egyptian president Abdel Fattah el-Sisi, Israeli president Isaac Herzog, Turkish president Recep Tayyip Erdoğan, Bulgarian president Rumen Radev, Kyrgyz president Sadyr Japarov, Belarusian president Alexander Lukashenko, Serbian president Aleksandar Vučić, Slovak prime minister Eduard Heger, Chinese premier Li Keqiang, Austrian chancellor Karl Nehammer, and Czech prime minister Petr Fiala.

Other politicians and political parties to congratulate Orbán included Matteo Salvini, leader of Italy's Northern League and former deputy prime minister, Hunor Kelemen, leader of Romania's UDMR and deputy prime minister, Nigel Farage, former leader of United Kingdom's Brexit Party, former Slovak prime minister Robert Fico, former U.S. president Donald Trump, Marine Le Pen, leader of France's National Rally, Dutch Party for Freedom politician Geert Wilders, Milorad Dodik, the Serb member of the Presidency of Bosnia and Herzegovina, and the Spanish political party Vox. Reflecting ongoing tensions over Russian sanctions, Polish prime minister Mateusz Morawiecki was slightly more reserved but said that "regardless of [Poland's] relations with Hungary, we must note that the Fidesz-Christian Democrat alliance won its fourth consecutive election with the best possible results."

The President of the European Council, Charles Michel, also congratulated Orbán, while the Secretary General of NATO, Jens Stoltenberg, expressed "acknowledgment" of the results.

Two days after the election, European Commission president Ursula von der Leyen announced that the Commission would begin cutting funding to Hungary over rule-of-law concerns. Hungarian government officials criticized the move as an attempt to "punish Hungarian voters."

See also 
Fifth Orbán Government
List of members of the National Assembly of Hungary (2022–2026)

Notes

References

External links
Valasztas

Hungary
Parliament
Hungary
Elections in Hungary
Landslide victories